Deathmatch or Death Match may refer to:

Arts, entertainment, and media
Death Match (Lincoln Child novel), a 2004 novel by Lincoln Child
Death Match, a 2001 album by Garlic Boys
Deathmatch (gaming), video gameplay whose goal is to kill as many other players as possible
Tom Clancy's Net Force Explorers: Death Match (2003), a young adult novel series

Sports
Hardcore wrestling, a form of professional wrestling that eschews traditional concepts of match rules
The Death Match, a wartime football match in 1942 in Kiev between a local team and Nazi soldiers

See also
 Funeral Games (disambiguation)
 Game of Death (disambiguation)